The Grindeanu cabinet was the 126th government of Romania which was formed after the 2016 legislative election. It was led by Sorin Grindeanu, who assumed office as Prime Minister on 4 January up until the end of his term on 29 June 2017. The cabinet was dismissed after a motion of no confidence initiated by the Social Democratic Party (PSD), the same party from which Grindeanu stemmed.

Membership

References

External links 

 List of ministers on gov.ro

2017 establishments in Romania
Cabinets established in 2017
Cabinets of Romania
Cabinets disestablished in 2017